Cocktail Kings is a British television program on the Discovery Travel Channel hosted by Colin Asare-Appiah and Dimitri Lezinska.  The program follows the two personalities in their journeys around Europe and the United States.

External links
 Cocktail Kings Official Website

British reality television series